The 2016–17 UNC Wilmington Seahawks women's basketball team represented the University of North Carolina Wilmington during the 2016–17 NCAA Division I women's basketball season. The Seahawks, led by fifth year head coach Adell Harris, played their home games at the Trask Coliseum and were members of the Colonial Athletic Association (CAA). They finished the season 11–20, 5–13 in CAA play to finish in a 3-way tie for eight place. They advanced to the quarterfinals of the CAA women's tournament where they lost to James Madison.

Roster

Schedule

|-
!colspan=9 style="background:#006666; color:#FFFF66;"| Non-conference regular season

|-
!colspan=9 style="background:#006666; color:#FFFF66;"| CAA regular season

|-
!colspan=9 style="background:#006666; color:#FFFF66;"| CAA Women's Tournament

Notes

See also
2016–17 UNC Wilmington Seahawks men's basketball team

References

UNC Wilmington Seahawks women's basketball seasons
Unc Wilmington